Buccinastrum paytense, common name the Payta buccinum, is a species of sea snail, a marine gastropod mollusk in the family Nassariidae, the Nassa mud snails or dog whelks.

Description
The size of the shell attains 55 mm.

The smooth shell is ovate and oblong. Its ground color is whitish, marked with longitudinal reddish lines. The epidermis which covers it, is pretty thick, and of a beautiful chestnut color. The spire is elongated, pointed, composed of seven slightly convex whorls. The whitish aperture is ovate, slightly narrowed towards the upper part, and widened at the base, which is rather deeply emarginated. The thin outer lip is slightly rounded, compressed towards its upper third. The columella shows a white callosity, adhering to the body of the shell, and partially formed by the left lip.

Distribution
This marine species occurs from Argentina to Chile. It also inhabits the rocks of Payta upon the coasts of Peru.

References

 Cernohorsky W. O. (1984). Systematics of the family Nassariidae (Mollusca: Gastropoda). Bulletin of the Auckland Institute and Museum 14: 1–356.

External links
 Kiener L.C. (1834-1841). Spécies général et iconographie des coquilles vivantes. Vol. 9. Famille des Purpurifères. Deuxième partie. Genres Colombelle, (Columbella), Lamarck, pp. 1-63, pl. 1-16
 Reeve, L. A. (1846-1847). Monograph of the genus Buccinum. In: Conchologia Iconica, or, illustrations of the shells of molluscous animals, vol. 3, pl. 1-14 and unpaginated text. L. Reeve & Co., London.
 King, P. P. (1832). Description of the Cirrhipeda, Conchifera and Mollusca, in a collection formed by the officers of H.M.S. Adventure and Beagle employed between the years 1826 and 1830 in surveying the southern coasts of South America, including the Straits of Magalhaens and the coast of Tierra del Fuego. 1832; for the date and authorship of this work. Zoological Journal, see Coan, Petit & Zelaya, 2011, The Nautilus. 5(125): 332-349
 Pastorino, G. & Simone, L.R.L. (2021). Revision of the genus Buccinanops (Mollusca: Neogastropoda: Nassariidae), an endemic group of gastropods from the Southwestern Atlantic, including a new genus and accounts on the Buccinanopsinae classification. Journal of Zoological Systematics and Evolutionary Research. 59(6): 1209-1254

Buccinanopsidae 
Gastropods described in 1834